Aklan Catholic College is a private Catholic college in Kalibo, Aklan, Philippines.

It offers courses in education, English, politics, commerce, business administration, computer science, criminology and hospitality management among others.

References

External links
Official website

Universities and colleges in Aklan
Catholic universities and colleges in the Philippines
Catholic elementary schools in the Philippines
Catholic secondary schools in the Philippines